The Islamic Academy for Peace (Arabic: الأكاديمية الإسلامية للسلام ) is a private
Islamic elementary and middle school, with grades Daycare, PreK–8 in Methuen, Massachusetts. It had its beginnings in 2001, with a few teachers and a handful of students. Today, the school has grown to have a staff of teachers and over 150 students. The school plans to expand to include a high school..

Each day, children pray the mid-day prayer at school.  Salat-ul-Jumu'ah, or the Friday prayers, are attended by the upper-grade students at the Selimiye Camii Mosque, located within walking distance.

Background
The school was founded in 2001 by The school was founded by Shaban Catalbas, who has a granddaughter named Zehra Catalbas attending 7th grade. It is located at 125 Oakland Ave, Methuen, Massachusetts.

Ratings
TIA has been rated by many school rating companies, such as Great Schools, Education.com, and Private School Review.

Hajj Re-enactment Day, 2007

The Hajj Re-enactment Day of 2007 was covered by the local press, in a feature program, "Sounds of the Season".
An exclusive video can be found at the school's site.

Jowdy World Knowledge Challenge

TIA takes part in an annual world geography competition held at the Lawrence Public Library.

References

External links 
The Islamic Academy Official Website
The Islamic Academy's PTO Website

Islamic schools in Massachusetts
Schools in Essex County, Massachusetts
Buildings and structures in Methuen, Massachusetts
Private elementary schools in Massachusetts
Private middle schools in Massachusetts